Acacia dissona is a shrub of the genus Acacia and the subgenus Plurinerves that is endemic to an area of south western Australia.

Description
Like most species of Acacia it has phyllodes rather than true leaves. It blooms from July to October and produces yellow flowers. Following flowering it produces linear seed pods that are raised over and constricted between each of the seeds.

Taxonomy
The species was first formally described by the botanists Richard Sumner Cowan and Bruce Maslin in 1995 as a part of the work Acacia Miscellany. Five groups of microneurous species of Acacia (Leguminosae: Mimosoideae: section Plurinerves), mostly from Western Australia as published in the journal Nuytsia.
There are two recognised varieties:
 Acacia dissona var. dissona
 Acacia dissona var. indoloria

Distribution
It is native to an area in the Wheatbelt and Goldfields-Esperance regions of Western Australia where it is commonly situated on undulating plains growing in sandy, clay or loamy soils. It has a discontinuous and scattered distribution from Coorow in the north west to Ongerup in the south west to Southern Cross in the north east and Norseman in the south east.

See also
 List of Acacia species

References

dissona
Acacias of Western Australia
Taxa named by Bruce Maslin
Plants described in 1995